Kirian Rodríguez Ledesma (born 22 July 1984), often known simply as Kirian, is a Spanish footballer who plays for UD Orotava as a central defender.

Football career
Born in Candelaria, Tenerife, Kirian began his career with CD Tenerife, making his professional debut in the second division and playing six matches in the 2003–04 season. He became a regular in the following years with the Canary Islands club in the same level, being definitely released in December 2006 and joining neighbouring UD Vecindario the following month.

Kirian moved to amateurs SE Eivissa-Ibiza in the summer of 2007, but left for Germany after one and a half seasons in division three, signing with FSV Frankfurt. On 11 May 2010, after appearing rarely for the second tier side, he was released from contract.

References

External links

Kicker profile 

1984 births
Living people
People from Tenerife
Sportspeople from the Province of Santa Cruz de Tenerife
Spanish footballers
Footballers from the Canary Islands
Association football defenders
Segunda División players
Segunda División B players
Tercera División players
CD Tenerife players
UD Vecindario players
2. Bundesliga players
FSV Frankfurt players
Spain youth international footballers
Spanish expatriate footballers
Expatriate footballers in Germany
Spanish expatriate sportspeople in Germany